Ethnic Chinese in Panama, also variously referred to as Chinese Panamanians, Panamanian Chinese, Panama Chinese or in Spanish as chino-panameños, are Panamanian citizens and residents of Chinese origin or descent.

History
The Chinese community in Panama began to form in the latter half of the 19th century. The first group of Chinese labourers arrived in the country on 30 March 1854 aboard the Clipper Sea Witch to work on the Panama Railroad and later established in Jamaica. By the early 20th century, they had already come to play a crucial role in other sectors of the economy as well; they owned over 600 retail stores, and the entire country was said to depend on provisions from their stores. The community faced various challenges, including a 1903 law declaring them as "undesirable citizens", a 1913 head tax, a 1928 law requiring them to submit special petitions in order to become Panamanian citizens, and the revocation of their citizenship under the 1941 constitution promulgated by Arnulfo Arias. However, their citizenship was restored in 1946 under the new constitution which declared all people born in Panama to be citizens. Immigration slowed during the 1960s and 1970s, but resumed during the reform and opening up of China, as Deng Xiaoping's government began to relax emigration restrictions. The older Chinatowns, such as the one at Salsipuedes, have become of less importance in the Chinese community recently. Though they were described as "hives" of activity in the 1950s and 1960s, the opening of large department stores reduced the importance of Chinese retailers, and as the years went on, many closed their shops; a few retailers of Chinese products remain in the area, staffed by recent immigrants. Many Chinese emigrated to neighboring Colombia and/or United States [where Chinese and Hispanic populations live] during the dictatorship of Manuel Antonio Noriega.

Demographics
As of 2003, there were estimated to be between 135,000 and 200,000 Chinese in Panama, making them the largest Chinese community in Central America; they are served by thirty-five separate ethnic representative organisations. Their numbers include 80,000 new immigrants from mainland China and 300 from Taiwan; 80% are of  Hakka origin, with the rest being Cantonese and Mandarin speakers. In the aftermath of the Tiananmen Square protests of 1989, many mainland Chinese fled to Panama by way of Hong Kong on temporary visas and short-term residency permits; estimates of the size of the influx ranged from 9,000 to 35,000. The latest wave of immigrants are less educated than earlier arrivals, and their presence has caused internal tensions within the Chinese community. Tensions have also arisen due to external factors; the government of the People's Republic of China vies with the Republic of China on Taiwan for influence among the local Chinese community, hoping to gain formal diplomatic recognition from the Panamanian government. Both sides have funded the building of schools and other community facilities and donated millions of dollars worth of Chinese textbooks.
The National Chinese Ethnic Council created by Law 32 of 2014, made up of nine members, six are ethnic chinese, the first secretary of the Council is Juan Tam, and representatives of the Ministry of Social Development (MIDES), Ministry of Education (MEDUCA) and Ministry of Culture (MICULTURA).

Notable individuals
Jorge Cham, web comic creator of Piled Higher and Deeper
Bruce Chen, pitcher for the Cleveland Indians
Roberto Chen, Panamanian footballer of Chinese descent
Marelissa Him, model, part Chinese on her father's side
Shey Ling Him Gordon, Panama's delegate to the Miss World 2007 competition
Sigrid Nunez, American writer (Chinese-Panamanian father, German mother)

References

Further reading

 
Panama
Chinese Latin American
Ethnic groups in Panama